Associated Private Nature Reserves, (APNR), is an association of privately owned nature reserves bordering on the Kruger National Park. Collectively they represent  of land dedicated to conservation. In June 1993 the fences between Kruger National Park and the APNR were removed.

The following reserves are members of the APNR:

 Balule Nature Reserve, also known as Bulule Private Game Reserve 
 Greater Olifants River Conservancy
 Olifants West Game Reserve
 York Game Reserve
 Parsons Game Reserve
 Olifants North Game Reserve
 Grietjie Game Reserve.
 Mohlabetsi South Nature Reserve (Including Jejane Private Nature Reserve).
 Mohlabetsi River Nature Reserve.
 Kapama Game Reserve, also known as Kapama Private Game Reserve.
 Klaserie Game Reserve, also known as Klaserie Private Nature Reserve.
 Timbavati Game Reserve, also known as Timbavati Private Game Resereve.
 Thornybush Game Reserve, also known as Thornybush Private Game Reserve.
 Umbabat Game Reserve, also known as Umbabat Private Game Reserve

See also 
 Protected areas of South Africa
 Greater Kruger National Park

References

External links 
 Timbavati Private Nature Reserve

Nature reserves in South Africa